Inigo derives from the Castilian rendering (Íñigo) of the medieval Basque name Eneko. Ultimately, the name means "my little (love)".  While mostly seen among the Iberian diaspora, it also gained a limited popularity in the United Kingdom.

Early traces of the name Eneko go back to Roman times, when the Bronze of Ascoli included the name forms Enneges and Ennegenses among a list of Iberian horsemen granted Roman citizenship in 89 B.C.E. In the early Middle Ages, the name appears in Latin, as Enneco, and Arabic, as Wannaqo (ونقه) in reports of Íñigo Arista (c. 790–851 or 852), a Basque who ruled Pamplona. It can be compared with its feminine form, Oneca. It was frequently represented in medieval documents as Ignatius (Spanish "Ignacio"), which is thought to be etymologically distinct, coming from the Roman name Egnatius, from Latin ignotus, meaning "unknowing", or from the Latin word for fire, ignis. The familiar Ignatius may simply have served as a convenient substitution when representing the unfamiliar Íñigo/Eneko in scribal Latin.

People

Athletes
Iñigo Calderón (born 1982), Spanish Basque footballer who played at Brighton and Hove Albion
Iñigo Córdoba (born 1997), Spanish Basque footballer
Íñigo Cuesta (born 1969), Spanish Basque cyclist
Iñigo Díaz de Cerio (born 1984), Spanish Basque footballer, currently playing for CD Mirandés
Íñigo Eguaras (born 1992), Spanish Navarrese footballer
Iñigo Idiakez (born 1973), Spanish Basque footballer who played for Real Sociedad
Iñigo Martínez (born 1991), Spanish Basque footballer who played for Athletic Bilbao
Iñigo Monreal (born 1974), Spanish Basque athlete
Iñigo Landaluze (born 1977), Spanish Basque cyclist
Iñigo Larrainzar (born 1971), Spanish Basque footballer
Iñigo Pérez (born 1987), Spanish Navarrese footballer, currently playing for Athletic Bilbao
Iñigo Ruiz de Galarreta (born 1993), Spanish Basque footballer, currently playing for Athletic Bilbao
Iñigo Vélez (born 1982), Spanish Basque footballer, currently playing for Xerez CD

Religious figures and saints
Íñigo López de Loyola, Saint Ignatius of Loyola (1491–1556), Spanish Basque priest, theologian and saint, founder of the Society of Jesus
Íñigo of Oña (Ignatius, Enecus) (d. 1057), Castilian abbot and saint
Íñigo López de Mendoza y Zúñiga (1476–1535), Castilian clergyman and diplomat, Archbishop of Burgos
Fray Íñigo Abbad y Lasierra (1745–1813), Spanish monk and the first to document Puerto Rico's history

Nobles
Íñigo Arista of Pamplona (died 852), king of Pamplona
Íñigo Fernández de Velasco, 2nd Duke of Frías (1462–1528), Spanish grandee and military leader
Íñigo López (floruit 1040–1076), first Lord of Biscay
Íñigo López de Mendoza, 4th Duke of the Infantado
Íñigo Vélez de Guevara (disambiguation), three members of a Spanish noble family from the 17th century

Politicians
Íñigo Errejón (born 1983), Spanish political scientist and politician
Iñigo Urkullu (born 1961), lehendakari of the Basque Government
Íñigo Méndez de Vigo (born 1956), Spanish politician

Other
Íñigo López de Mendoza, 1st Marquis of Santillana (1398–1458), Castilian poet
Inigo Campioni (1878–1944), Italian admiral
Inigo Gallo (1932–2000), Swiss comedian and actor
Inigo Jackson (1933–2001), British actor
Inigo Jones (1573–1652), British architect
Inigo Owen Jones (1872–1954), British meteorologist
Iñigo Manglano-Ovalle (born 1961), American artist and MacArthur Fellow
Inigo Philbrick (born 1987/1988), American art dealer and convicted fraudster
Inigo Triggs (1876–1923), British garden designer and author

Fictional characters
Inigo Montoya, a swordsman in The Princess Bride
Inigo Pipkin, a puppet maker in Pipkins
Inigo Balboa, narrator of the Capitan Alatriste novels
Inigo Jollifant, a piano player in The Good Companions, by J. B. Priestley

As surname
José María Íñigo (1942–2018), Spanish journalist and television presenter

See also
Ignatius
Ignacio

References

Spanish masculine given names